Chaman Laleh (also Romanized as Chaman Lāleh; also known as Chaman) is a village in Gazin Rural District, Raghiveh District, Haftgel County, Khuzestan Province, Iran. At the 2006 census, its population was 326, in 84 families.

References 

Populated places in Haftkel County